Ptychodactis is a genus of sea anemones. It is the only genus in the monotypic family Ptychodactinidae.

Species
There are two species recognized in the genus:
 Ptychodactis aleutiensis Eash-Loucks, Jewett, Fautin, Hoberg & Chenelot, 2010
 Ptychodactis patula Appellöf, 1893

References

Ptychodactinidae
Hexacorallia genera